Bexton is a civil parish to the south west of Knutsford, in the unitary authority of Cheshire East, England. According to the 2001 census it had a population of 9. At the 2011 Census the population remained minimal, and details are included in the civil parish of Peover Inferior.

Bexton Hall is designated by English Heritage as a Grade II* listed building, and is the only listed building in the parish.

References

External links

Villages in Cheshire
Civil parishes in Cheshire